Agrupación Deportiva Alcorcón "B" is the reserve team of AD Alcorcón, was founded in 1998, and plays in Tercera División - Group 7, is based in Alcorcón, in the autonomous community of Madrid. Holding home matches at Campo Anexo de Santo Domingo, with a 1000-seat capacity.

Season to season

9 seasons in Tercera División
1 season in Tercera División RFEF

Current squad
.

From Youth Academy

Current technical staff

References

External links
Official website 
Futbolme team profile 
 

Football clubs in the Community of Madrid
Association football clubs established in 1971
1998 establishments in Spain
 
Spanish reserve football teams